Srbijagas (full legal name: J.P. Srbijagas) is the state-owned natural gas provider in Serbia with headquarters in Novi Sad.

History
Srbijagas was established on 1 October 2005 as a result of restructuring the integrated petroleum company NIS. The company was created on the basis of NIS divisions NIS-Gas and NIS-Energogas.

In 2013, the government of Serbia decided to split Srbijagas into two separate companies because of its mounting debt and unsustainable business practices. Since 2013, the transportation and storage units have been operated by Transgas AD, while trade and distribution have continued to be operated by the Srbijagas AD.

Subsidiaries
  Bijeljina, Bosnia and Herzegovina
 , Bosnia and Herzegovina
 , Montenegro
 South Stream Serbia AG, Switzerland
 Gas d.o.o. Bečej
 HIP-Azotara d.o.o. Pančevo
  Kikinda
 Loznica-gas d.o.o. Loznica
 Transportgas Srbija d.o.o. Novi Sad
 Distribucijagas Srbija d.o.o. Novi Sad
  Belgrade
 Podzemno skladište gasa d.o.o. Banatski dvor
 Sogaz a.d. Novi Sad
 Informatika a.d. Belgrade
 Yugorosgaz a.d. Belgrade
 Specijalana luka d.o.o. Pančevo
 Toza Marković a.d. Kikinda
 Prirodni gas d.o.o. Pančevo
 HIP-Petrohemija a.d. Pančevo

Financial data
At the end of 2011, the company's total equity was US$443.38 million and after one year it dropped to only US$15.86 million, making the company for the first time unprofitable, mainly because of differences in cost and selling price.

In April 2013, Minister of Energy, Development and Environmental Protection, Zorana Mihajlović stated that Srbijagas has debt of more than €1 billion.

In June 2014, it was once again named the most unprofitable state-owned company, making annual net loss of €443.14 million for the calendar year of 2013.

For the calendar year of 2014, Srbijagas finished with the yet another annual net loss of €372.33 million.

For the calendar year of 2015, Srbijagas managed to severely cut total net loss from the past year to just €2.98 million. After several years of posting annual net losses, Srbijagas finished 2016 calendar year with the annual net profit of €13.78 million.

See also
Serbian Stream

References

External links
 

Companies based in Novi Sad
Government-owned companies of Serbia
Natural gas pipeline companies
Oil and gas companies of Serbia
Serbian companies established in 2005
Energy companies established in 2005